Frutos Bernardo Patón de Ayala (1600 – 28 November 1671) was a Roman Catholic prelate who served as Bishop of Sigüenza (1669–1671) and Bishop of Coria (1664–1669).

Biography
Frutos Bernardo Patón de Ayala was born in El Espinar, Spain in 1600 and ordained a priest in October 1631. On 23 June 1664, he was appointed during the papacy of Pope Alexander VII as Bishop of Coria. On 4 February 1669, he was appointed during the papacy of Pope Clement IX as Bishop of Sigüenza. He served as Bishop of Sigüenza until his death on 28 November 1671.

References

External links and additional sources
 (for Chronology of Bishops) 
 (for Chronology of Bishops) 
 (for Chronology of Bishops) 
 (for Chronology of Bishops) 

17th-century Roman Catholic bishops in Spain
Bishops appointed by Pope Alexander VII
Bishops appointed by Pope Clement IX
1600 births
1671 deaths